This page lists appearances of American jazz musician Herbie Hancock as a sideman in recordings of other artists (that includes also the year of recordings if the albums were released at least two years later).

As sideman

 For every year (here reported chronologically) the albums are listed alphabetically by the last name of the artist.

See also
 Herbie Hancock discography
 The Headhunters
 V.S.O.P.

References

External links
 Herbie Hancock Official website
 Herbie Hancock on AllMusic
 Herbie Hancock on Discogs
 Herbie Hancock on Rate Your Music

Discographies of American artists
Other appearances
Jazz discographies